For the Love of Mike may refer to:
 For the Love of Mike (1927 film), an American silent romantic drama film
 For the Love of Mike (1932 film), a British musical comedy film
 None but the Brave (1960 film), also known as For the Love of Mike, an American Western film
 For the Love of Mike (novel), a 2003 novel by Rhys Bowen